Toni Kluuskeri (born April 7, 1991) is a Finnish former professional ice hockey forward. He last played for the Jokers de Cergy-Pontoise of the French Ligue Magnus.

Kluuskeri began his playing career with TPS, playing nine games during the 2010–11 SM-liiga season where he registered one assist. He spent the following season with Lukko's U20 junior team but never played a game for their senior side. From 2012, Kluuskeri has played outside of Finland, beginning with a spell in France's Ligue Magnus for Pingouins de Morzine-Avoriaz. On May 15, 2013, Kluuskeri signed for Nittorps IK of Sweden's third tier Hockeyettan.

Kluuskeri returned to France in 2014, signing for FFHG Division 1 side Corsaires de Dunkerque before moving to Australia to sign for the Perth Thunder. On August 13, 2015, Kluuskeri signed for Narvik Hockey of Norway's First Division. The following year, he returned to France for a third time, joining Remparts de Tours.

References

External links

1991 births
Living people
Finnish ice hockey forwards
Corsaires de Dunkerque players
Diables Noirs de Tours players
HC Morzine-Avoriaz players
HC TPS players
Narvik IK players
People from Uusikaupunki
Perth Thunder players
TuTo players
Finnish expatriate ice hockey players in France
Finnish expatriate ice hockey players in Norway
Finnish expatriate ice hockey players in Sweden
Sportspeople from Southwest Finland
Finnish expatriate ice hockey players in Australia